William Scully may refer to:

William Scully (Australian politician) (1883–1966), Australian politician and farmer
William Scully (director) (1889–1949), American filmmaker and director
William Scully (bishop) (1894–1969), American Roman Catholic bishop of Albany
William Charles Scully (1855–1943), South African author

Fictional characters
William "Bill" Scully, the name of several characters The X-Files related to Dana Scully: her father, brother and son